"Tarzan Boy" is the debut single by Italian-based act Baltimora. The song was written by Maurizio Bassi and Naimy Hackett, and released in 1985 as the lead single from Baltimora's debut album Living in the Background. The song was re-recorded and released in 1993, and has been covered by several artists throughout the years.

The refrain uses Tarzan's cry as a melodic line. The song is rhythmical, with an electronic melody and simple lyrics. Baltimora are often considered a one-hit wonder due to the success they experienced with "Tarzan Boy". It features a melodic motif that was later named the millennial whoop.

The music video for the song features the frontman for the band's performances, Jimmy McShane, who according to some sources did not actually sing the song but rather lip synced it.

Chart performance
"Tarzan Boy" was an international hit, debuting in the top five Italian charts and performing well in several other European countries, including Spain, Germany, the Netherlands, and notably, France, where "Tarzan Boy" was most successful, topping the charts there for five consecutive weeks. In the United Kingdom, it reached number 3 in September 1985. The single had success in the United States (where it was released by EMI), with the single remaining on the Billboard Hot 100 chart for six months and ultimately peaking at number 13 in early 1986.

"Tarzan Boy" would re-enter the Billboard charts as a slightly re-recorded version at number 68 and peak at number 51 five weeks later. It would spend an additional 12 weeks on the chart, exiting the Hot 100 on June 12, 1993.

Track listing and formats

Original version

7" single
"Tarzan Boy" – 3:48
"Tarzan Boy" (DJ version) – 3:36

12" single
"Tarzan Boy" (extended version) – 6:15
"Tarzan Boy" (DJ version) – 5:09 

12" maxi
"Tarzan Boy" (extended dance version) – 6:16
"Tarzan Boy" (single version) – 3:49
"Tarzan Boy" (extended dub version) – 5:10

12" maxi – Summer version
"Tarzan Boy" (Summer version) – 6:40
"Tarzan Boy" (reprise) – 6:00

1993 version

CD single
"Tarzan Boy" (original version) – 3:49
"Tarzan Boy" (1993 remix) – 3:49

12" single
"Tarzan Boy" (original version) – 3:49
"Tarzan Boy" (UK swing mix) – 3:18
"Tarzan Boy" (extended dub) – 5:10

CD maxi
"Tarzan Boy" (1993 remix) – 3:49
"Tarzan Boy" (extended 1993 remix) – 5:33
"Tarzan Boy" (extended dub mix) – 5:10

Cassette
"Tarzan Boy" (original version) – 3:49
"Tarzan Boy" (1993 remix) – 3:49
"Tarzan Boy" (original version) – 3:49
"Tarzan Boy" (1993 remix) – 3:49

CD maxi – Promo
"Tarzan Boy" (original version) – 3:45
"Tarzan Boy" (1993 remix) – 3:46
"Tarzan Boy" (extended 1993 remix) – 5:35
"Tarzan Boy" (UK swing mix) – 3:21
"Tarzan Boy" (extended dub) – 5:01

2010 version
Streaming single
"Tarzan Boy" (Digital Remaster) – 3:49

Charts and certifications

Weekly charts

Year-end charts

Certifications

Cover versions
In 1989, the Hindi song "Aaya Mausam Dosti Ka", from the Bollywood soundtrack for the film Maine Pyar Kiya was heavily influenced by "Tarzan Boy".
In 2006, the song was covered by Bango, and achieved a minor success, peaking at number 37 in France.
In 2008, a cover by Bad Influence featuring Dyce reached number 9 in Sweden.

See also
List of Dutch Top 40 number-one singles of 1985
List of European number-one hits of 1985
List of number-one singles of 1985 (France)
List of number-one singles of 1985 (Spain)

References

1985 debut singles
1985 songs
Baltimora songs
Songs written by Maurizio Bassi
EMI Records singles
Capitol Records singles
Manhattan Records singles
Dutch Top 40 number-one singles
European Hot 100 Singles number-one singles
SNEP Top Singles number-one singles
Number-one singles in Spain
Ultratop 50 Singles (Flanders) number-one singles
Songs about fictional male characters
Music based on novels
Works based on Tarzan